Voltar may refer to:

 Voltar (comics), an award-winning comics strip and character by Alfredo Alcala
 Voltar (G.I. Joe), a fictional character in the G.I. Joe universe
 Voltar, the main character in the League of Super Evil
 Voltar, the fictional planet that the "expose books" are published on in the Mission Earth fictional universe
 Voltar the Invincible, the U.S. title for Robot Taekwon V
 Voltar the Omniscient, a character in the MOBA  Awesomenauts